Austin D Verner (born 1943), is a male former swimmer who competed for England.

Swimming career
He represented England in the 440 yards freestyle event, at the 1962 British Empire and Commonwealth Games in Perth, Western Australia.

He swam for the Urmston Swimming Club.

References

1943 births
English male freestyle swimmers
Swimmers at the 1962 British Empire and Commonwealth Games
Living people
Commonwealth Games competitors for England